The Roman Catholic Diocese of Ciudad Altamirano is a suffragan diocese of the Archdiocese of Acapulco, in Mexico.

Ordinaries
Juan Navarro Ramirez (1965–1970) 
Manuel Samaniego Barriga (1971–1979), appointed Bishop of Cuautitlán, México
José Lizares Estrada (1980–1987) 
José Raúl Vera López, O.P. (1987–1995), appointed Coadjutor Bishop of San Cristóbal de Las Casas, Chiapas 
Carlos Garfias Merlos (1996–2003), appointed Bishop of Netzahualcóyotl, México
José Miguel Ángel Giles Vázquez (2004–2005) 
Maximino Martínez Miranda (2006–2018), appointed Auxiliary Bishop of Toluca, México
Joel Ocampo Gorostieta (2019–-)

Episcopal see
Ciudad Altamirano, Guerrero

External links and references

Ciudad Altamirano
Ciudad Altamirano, Roman Catholic Diocese of
Ciudad Altamirano
Ciudad Altamirano